Paul Brycki (born June 29, 1950) is an American politician who served in the Connecticut House of Representatives from the 45th district from 2015 to 2017.

References

1950 births
Living people
Democratic Party members of the Connecticut House of Representatives